Henry Barker (8 June 1871 – March 1944) was a British middle-distance runner. He competed in the men's 3200 metres steeplechase at the 1908 Summer Olympics.

References

1871 births
1944 deaths
Athletes (track and field) at the 1908 Summer Olympics
British male middle-distance runners
British male steeplechase runners
Olympic athletes of Great Britain
Place of birth missing
Sportspeople from Barnsley